Plesippus is a genus of extinct horse from the Pleistocene of North America. Although commonly seen as a subgenus of Equus recent cladistic analysis considers it a distinct genus.

Species
Two species are recognized by Barron et al. (2019), P. simplicidens and P. idahoensis.

References

 The Hagerman Horse Quarry
 Hagerman Fossil Beds' Critter Corner - Hagerman Horse - Equus simplicidens, Dr. Greg McDonald

Pliocene horses
Prehistoric mammals of North America
Pliocene odd-toed ungulates
Pliocene first appearances
Pleistocene extinctions
Pleistocene horses
Equus (genus)
Extinct animals of the United States